Sincerely, Wasting Away is Diffuser's third album. It was released on August 19, 2008 by Chamberlain Records

Track listing

2008 albums
Diffuser (band) albums